Benoit Cyr (June 14, 1948 – ) is a pilot, entrepreneur and former political figure in New Brunswick, Canada. He represented Restigouche West in the Legislative Assembly of New Brunswick as a Progressive Conservative member from 1999 to 2003.

He was born in Saint-Quentin, New Brunswick, the son of Wilfrid Cyr and Berthe Lévesque. Cyr was educated in Saint-Quentin and at the New Brunswick Technical Institute in Moncton. He was owner and manager of Cyr Aviation.

References 
 New Brunswick MLAs, New Brunswick Legislative Library (pdf)

1948 births
Progressive Conservative Party of New Brunswick MLAs
Living people
21st-century Canadian politicians